Khatti Dal is a food originating in India and central to Hyderabadi cuisine. It is a type of dal made using Masoor dal or Toor dal. It is a popular dish in Andhra Pradesh and Telangana. The word khatti literally means "sour". It refers to the tangy taste which is essential to the dish brought about by adding tamarind. Khatti dal is typically served with rice and other meat or vegetable dishes.

See also
 Hyderabadi cuisine
 Dal

References

Hyderabadi cuisine
Telangana cuisine
Lentil dishes